The Tourbière-de-Shannon Ecological Reserve is a strictly protected ecological reserve of Quebec, Canada.

Location

The Tourbière-de-Shannon Ecological Reserve is in the municipality of Shannon, Jacques-Cartier Regional County Municipality, Capitale-Nationale administrative region.

The region was covered by the massive Laurentide Ice Sheet, which retreated almost 12,500 years ago and made way for the Champlain Sea.
As the land rose due to post-glacial rebound the sea retreated and the Saint Lawrence River developed about 9.500 years ago.
The land covered by the Tourbière de Shannon was in the Jacques-Cartier River delta on the border between the Laurentian Mountains and the Champlain Sea, and is dominated by thick sandy glaciofluvial deposits.

Environment

The Tourbière-de-Shannon Ecological Reserve is in the Basses-collines-du-lac-Saint-Joseph ecological district of the Southern Laurentide natural province.
The reserve is in the maple / basswood bioclimatic domain, with a subpolar and continental climate.
The growing season is 170–180 days.

Rare species

The Tourbière de Shannon holds over 1,000 individuals of the eastern prairie fringed orchid (Platanthera blephariglottis), growing near groves of larch and black spruce in open and semi-open areas.
There are also over 500 individuals of the southern twayblade (Listera australis) in areas where trees and shrubs give good protection, often on the south side of groves. 
This the second largest population of Southern Twayblade in Québec.

Notes

Citations

Sources

Protected areas of Capitale-Nationale
Nature reserves in Quebec
Protected areas established in 1975
1975 establishments in Quebec
La Jacques-Cartier Regional County Municipality